Anvar Gasimzade was an Azerbaijani architect, Honored Architect of the Azerbaijan SSR (1960), correspondent member of ANAS (1967), rector of Azerbaijan State Oil and Industry University (1962-1968).

Early life 
Anvar Gasimzade was born on 12 February 1912 in Salyan, Javad Uyezd of Russian Empire.

Education 
He received his primary education at Baku Teachers Seminary. In December 1930, he graduated from the construction department of Azerbaijan Industrial College and was sent to Azerbaijan Industrial Institute. He graduated from there in 1936 and became an engineer-architect.

Family 
His father Ali Bey Gasimov was one of the first teachers of Russian language and literature in Azerbaijan. Ali Bey had a relationship with Leo Tolstoy and met with him several times. His son Elbay Gasimzade is also an architect and the chairman of the Union of Architects of Azerbaijan since 2012.

War 
From the beginning of 1942 he took part in the Great Patriotic War. He fought from the banks of the Terek River to Berlin and was awarded 4 orders (Order of the Red Banner, Order of the Red Star and Order of the Patriotic War (the first and second ranks) and 5 medals. In June 1946, he was recalled from military service at the request of the Azerbaijani government.

Professional career 
Gasimzade started working in 1934 and taught at Baku Construction College. In 1941, he was appointed head of the Head Department of Housing and Communal Services and at the same time director of the Baku Construction College.

Since 1947, he had held various senior government positions. In 1953-1955, he served as Minister of Construction, in 1955-1957 as Chairman of the State Construction Committee, in 1957-1959 as First Deputy Chairman of the State Planning Committee. He taught architecture for most of his life. He is the author of more than 60 scientific articles and 7 monographs. 

Anvar Gasimzade was repeatedly elected to the Baku City Council and the Supreme Soviet of the Azerbaijan SSR. He was a member of the Baku City Committee of the Communist Party of Azerbaijan and the Central Committee of the Azerbaijan Communist Party.

Major projects 
He designed dozens of houses and public buildings built in Baku, Ganja, Dashkasan and Khankendi. These include the houses on Azerbaijan Avenue, Inshaatchilar Avenue, the former North Soviet Square, Aga Nematulla Street in Baku, the current administrative buildings of the State Customs Committee and the Ministry of Finance, the main buildings of the Azerbaijan Medical University on Bakikhanov Street, Ulduz metro station and others.

Death 
Gasimzade died on March 12, 1969, at the age of 57 and was buried in the Alley of Honor. There are streets named after him in Baku and Salyan.

See also 
 Mikayil Huseynov

References

1912 births
1969 deaths
Soviet architects
20th-century Azerbaijani architects
People from Salyan District (Azerbaijan)
Azerbaijani architects